Fabry Destin Makita-Passy (born October 23, 1984) is a football (soccer) defender from the Republic of the Congo for AC Léopards.

Career
He previously played for Delta Téléstar in Gabon and Orlando Pirates in the South African Premier Soccer League.

International career
Makita has made several appearances for the Republic of the Congo national football team.

References

1984 births
Republic of the Congo footballers
Expatriate soccer players in South Africa
Republic of the Congo international footballers
Living people
Orlando Pirates F.C. players
Republic of the Congo expatriate sportspeople in South Africa
Association football defenders
Delta Téléstar players
Expatriate footballers in Gabon
Republic of the Congo expatriate footballers
Sportspeople from Brazzaville